Elong may refer to:

eLong, Chinese travel agency
Jacques Elong Elong (born 1981), Cameroonian football player